The GER Class T19 was a class of  steam tender locomotives designed by James Holden for the Great Eastern Railway.  Some were later rebuilt with larger boilers while others were rebuilt with both larger boilers and a  wheel arrangement. Unusually, both the 2-4-0 and 4-4-0 rebuilds were classified as GER Class T19 Rebuilt.  All the 2-4-0s had been withdrawn by 1920 so only the 4-4-0s passed to the London and North Eastern Railway in 1923 and these became the LNER Class D13.

Standard 2-4-0s
The T19s was similar to the Worsdell Class G14, but had a slightly larger boiler. One hundred and ten locomotives were constructed. They had  cylinders and the last ten had  boilers, but the remainder were gradually fitted with two-ring boilers.

No. 758 was fitted with an extended smokebox in 1900. Oil burning apparatus was fitted to No. 712 and 759–767. No. 760 was named Petrolea. Tenders with water scoops were fitted to Nos. 762–767 and 1030–1039 to enable the Cromer expresses to run non-stop from Liverpool Street to North Walsham from 1 July 1897. Water troughs were installed at Halifax Junction, Ipswich and at Tivetshall St. Mary.

Royal trains

No. 755 hauled the funeral train for the late Prince Albert Victor, Duke of Clarence and Avondale from King's Lynn to Windsor on 28 January 1892. No. 761 hauled the honeymoon train for the late prince's brother and former fiancée the Duke and Duchess of York (later George V and Queen Mary) from Liverpool Street to King's Lynn on 6 July 1893.

Eighty-one were rebuilt at the beginning of the 20th century. The twenty-nine not rebuilt were scrapped between 1908 and 1913.

"Humpty Dumpty" 2-4-0s

Between 1902 and 1904, twenty-nine were rebuilt with new boilers with Belpaire fireboxes. With their small tenders, and a dome well-forward on the first ring, they looked front-heavy, and gained the nickname Humpty Dumpties. In fact they were so front heavy that they were never considered for superheating. They were withdrawn between 1913 and 1920.

4-4-0s
 
Between 1905 and 1908 sixty were rebuilt as 4-4-0 tender engines with the same new Belpaire boilers. The first ten re-used the bogies from Class G16 4-4-0s, while the other re-used the rear bogie from withdrawn Class E10 0-4-4T locomotives. Superheaters began to be fitted from 1913, and all those still in service in 1926 had been so fitted.

Two were withdrawn in 1922, and the remaining fifty-eight passed to the LNER at the 1923 grouping. The LNER Classified them as Class D13, and added 7000 to their Great Eastern number. They were initially repainted in the LNER passenger green livery, but from 1928, repaints were in black with red lining. Withdrawals continued steadily, until in 1944, the last survivor was withdrawn. See also (Ahrons 1951).

See also

 GER Class T26

References

External links

 — Great Eastern Railway Society

T19
2-4-0 locomotives
4-4-0 locomotives
Railway locomotives introduced in 1886
Standard gauge steam locomotives of Great Britain
Passenger locomotives